WMOO (92.1 FM) (also known as "Moo 92") is an adult top 40 formatted radio station broadcasting from Derby Center, Vermont, United States. It was rebroadcast on W257AU 99.3 in St. Johnsbury, until the translator's license was cancelled by the Federal Communications Commission on August 8, 2017.

The station broadcasts a weekday morning program The Moo 92 Wake Up Crew.  The show is sometimes broadcast from local nursing homes, food shelves, and local fire departments. The syndicated but live, Liveline with Mason Kelter currently airs every weeknight.

WMOO, along with 29 other Nassau Broadcasting Partners stations in northern New England, was purchased at bankruptcy auction by Carlisle Capital Corporation, a company controlled by Bill Binnie (owner of WBIN-TV in Derry, New Hampshire), on May 22, 2012. The station, and 12 of the other stations, were then acquired by Vertical Capital Partners, controlled by Jeff Shapiro. Soon after taking over, Vertical resold WMOO and WIKE to Vermont Broadcast Associates.

The sale of WMOO and the other 12 stations was consummated on November 30, 2012, at a purchase price of $4.4 million. The resale of WMOO and WIKE was consummated on January 1, 2013, at a purchase price of $760,000. The station is the #2 rated station in the Montpelier/Barre/Saint Johnsbury market, despite having a non-existent signal in Montpelier and Barre. It is the de facto top 40 station in the Saint Johnsbury and Newport, Vermont regions, and the only English pop station audible in Estrie.

References

External links

MOO
Derby, Vermont
Hot adult contemporary radio stations in the United States
Adult top 40 radio stations in the United States
Radio stations established in 1991